Christopher Columbus "C.C." Mercer (March 27, 1924 – November 20, 2012) was an African-American attorney from Arkansas. He was one of the "six pioneers" who integrated the University of Arkansas Law School. As an attorney, he served as an NAACP field representative to advise Daisy Bates, who spearheaded the efforts of the Little Rock Nine who integrated Little Rock Central High School.

Biography
Mercer was born in 1924 Pine Bluff, Arkansas where he graduated from Merrill High School and AM&N college. He served as principal of Conway Training School in Menifee, Arkansas. In 1949, Mercer and George W. B. Haley entered the University of Law School, one year after Silas Hunt became the first black student at a white southern University since reconstruction. OF the "six pioneers", he was the only one who did not serve in the army during World War II, and therefore frequently had to spend time off school to earn the money to pay for his education, serving in various jobs including teaching math at Carver High School in Marked Tree. In 1954, Mercer passed the bar with the highest score in the state.

Mercer was the first African American in the South to serve as a deputy state prosecutor. He practiced law for 58 years, frequently taking cases for clients with little of no means to pay for his services.

In 1957, when Little Rock Central was integrated, Mercer served as an advisor to one of the nine black students, Daisy Bates.

Mercer died November 20, 2012 at the age of 88.

References

American civil rights activists
People from Pine Bluff, Arkansas
Merrill High School alumni
1924 births
2012 deaths